25 mm caliber is a specific size of popular autocannon ammunition. Such ammunition includes the NATO-standard 25×137mm and 25×184mm, the Soviet 25x218mmSR, and the Chinese 25×183mmB.

Usage
The 25 mm round can be used in both an anti-materiel and anti-personnel fashion. When operating in the anti-personnel role, a 25 mm weapon armed with HE rounds can effectively kill large numbers of opposing troops either in the open or in light fortifications. When operating in the anti-materiel role, a 25 mm weapon armed with armor-piercing rounds can disable many aircraft and vehicles, including some main battle tanks.

The US military uses 25 mm weapons in their AV-8B Harrier, AC-130 gunship, M2 Bradley, LAV-25, F-35 Lightning II and as a standard ship-based munition in the Mk 38 autocannon.

Types of 25 mm ammunition

Several sub-types of the NATO 25 mm ammunition are available—the most common being armor-piercing, high-explosive, sabot, tracer, and practice rounds. Cartridges are usually composed of a combination of the aforementioned categories. For example, the M791 is an armor-piercing discarding sabot with tracer (APDS-T) round. It is used against lightly armored vehicles, self-propelled artillery, and aerial targets such as helicopters and slow-moving fixed-wing aircraft.

25 mm weapons
Each weapon is listed with its cartridge type appended.

Current weapons
M242 Bushmaster: 25×137mm
GAU-12/22 Equalizer: 25×137mm
GIAT M811: 25×137mm
Oerlikon KBA: 25×137mm
Oerlikon KBB: 25×184mm
Oerlikon KBD: 25×184mm
Type 61: 25×218mmSR
Type 95 SPAAA: 25×183mmB
ZPT-90: 25×183mmB

Historical weapons
25 mm Hotchkiss anti-aircraft gun/Type 96 25 mm AT/AA gun: 25×163mm
25 mm Hotchkiss anti-tank gun: 25×193.5mmR
25 mm M1940 anti-aircraft gun: 25×218mmSR
25 mm Bofors M/32 anti-aircraft gun: 25x205mmR (initial) or 25x187mmR (later)

See also
.50 BMG
14.5×114mm
20 mm caliber
23 mm caliber
23×115mm
23×152mm
25 mm caliber
25×40mm
25×59mm
30 mm caliber
List of cartridges (weaponry), pistol and rifle

Further reading 
U.S. Army Field Manual 3-22.1

External links
Federation of American Scientists: 25mm Ammunition
UXO Safety Information

Large-caliber cartridges